Clifford Aubrey McWatt (1 February 1922 – 20 July 1997) was a West Indian cricketer who played in six Tests in 1954 and 1955.

A wicket-keeper and useful lower-order batsman, McWatt made 54 and 36 not out against England on his Test debut in the First Test in Kingston in 1953–54, sharing seventh-wicket partnerships of 88 in the first innings with Gerry Gomez and 90 (unbroken) in the second innings with Everton Weekes. West Indies won easily. He played all five Tests in that series. The next season, he replaced Alfred Binns for the Second Test against Australia before being replaced in turn by Clairmonte Depeiaza for the Third Test.

He played for British Guiana from 1943–44 to 1956–57, and toured India, Pakistan and Ceylon in 1948–49 as the reserve wicket-keeper with the West Indian team. His highest first-class score was 128, for British Guiana against Trinidad in 1953–54.

McWatt moved to Canada in 1986, where he died on 20 July 1997 as a result of a car crash.

References

External links
 Clifford McWatt at Cricinfo
 Clifford McWatt at Cricket Archive

1922 births
1997 deaths
West Indies Test cricketers
Sportspeople from Georgetown, Guyana
Guyanese cricketers
Guyana cricketers
Road incident deaths in Canada
Accidental deaths in Ontario
Guyanese emigrants to Canada
Wicket-keepers